Waris Ali Shah (1817–1905) was a Sufi saint from Dewa, Barabanki, India, and the founder of the Warsi Sufi order. He traveled to many places specially Europe and the west and admitted people to his spiritual order. He belongs to the 26th generation of Hazrat Imam Hussain A.S    His shrine is at Dewa, India.

Life
In the book "Islamic Review and Muslim India", (Kraus Reprint, 1971) it was mentioned that Waris Ali Shah had lived his life as the Christ lived.

Father
His father was Qurban Ali Shah, whose tomb is in Dewa.

At an early age Shah showed an inclination for a religious life.

Social engagements
He went to Mecca for pilgrimage many times.  During his travels in Europe, he visited the Sultan of Turkey and Otto von Bismarck in Berlin. He also traveled to England and had an audience with Queen Victoria.

He was a friend of Abdul Bari.

Death
He died on 5 April 1905 (29 Muharram 1323 AH).

Sufi order

Waris Ali Shah belonged to the Qadiriyya order of Sufism. He had a liberal view and permitted his followers to follow Sufism and names may not be changed in case of one has accepted Islam.

As a boy, Shah attached himself to Khadim Ali Shah, a Dervish of Golaganj, Lucknow, in the state of Uttar Pradesh, India, and remained with the latter until his death in 1832–33 when Shah was 16 years old.

His disciples 
He had followers from several faiths.
Ghulam Muhammad (governor general of Pakistan)
Sultan Abdul Majed
 Hakeem Safdar Ali Warisi (Mahajan Title given by Haji Saheb) writer of Jalwaye Waris (Migrate from Gadia to Bahraich on Haji Saheb's order. His Grand Son Izhar Warsi is prominent poet of Urdu.)
 Thakur Pancham Singh.
 Zamindar Dt. Mainpuri.
 Raja Udyat Narayan Sing (Suratgunj, Oudh).
 Baboo Moti Misser (Bhagalpur).
 Thakur Grur Mohan Singh, Zamindar (Bhagalpur).
 Baba Sufi Syed Diwana Shah Warsi  first khalifa (roohani) and nephew (Jagatdal, West Bengal).
 Sadaf Jabbar Fazihat.
 Shah Abdul Ad Shah.
 Maulana Mohammad Shah.
 Mustaqim Shah.
 Faizu Shah
 Rahim Shah 
 Hafiz Pyaari
 Shakir Shah
 Avghat Shah
 Maroof Shah
 Noorkarim Shah
 Siddiq Shah (Amethi Sultanpur U.P India 
 Sai Baba of Shirdi 
 Bangali Shah(Kolkata India)
 Sandal Shah (Kolkata India)
 Mushir Husain Qidwai of Gadia, a zamindar, barrister and pan-Islamist politician from Barabanki.
Badnam Shah 
 Khuda Bakhsh Sheikh was a follower of Waris Ali Shah.  He collected the sayings of his spiritual guide Malfūzāt-i-Hāji Wāris 'Ali Shāh. His book, Tohmat-ul-Asfiya, is the biography of Waris Ali Shah.
Haseen Shah warsi
Bekarar Shah Warsi
Warsi Ghulam Mohammad Mallah

Death anniversary
Shah's father's death anniversary, locally known as Dewa Mela, is observed in October–November and is attended by nearly a million Muslims and Hindus.

Shah reportedly started this event in memory of his own father, Qurban Ali Shah. Another annual fair is held in Shah's tomb on 1 Safar.

See also 
Islam in India
Sufism in India

References

External links 
 Official website

Indian Sufi saints
Sufi religious leaders
1817 births
1905 deaths
Indian religious leaders
Scholars from Lucknow
Indian Sufis
People from Barabanki, Uttar Pradesh
19th-century Islamic religious leaders
20th-century Islamic religious leaders
19th-century Indian Muslims
20th-century Indian Muslims
19th-century Muslim scholars of Islam
20th-century Muslim scholars of Islam